The Stone of Jacob appears in the Book of Genesis as the stone used as a pillow by the Israelite patriarch Jacob at the place later called Bet-El. As Jacob had a vision in his sleep, he then consecrated the stone to God. More recently, the stone has been claimed by Scottish folklore and British Israelism.

Biblical narrative

According to account given in Genesis (Chapter 28:10-22), Jacob was fleeing from his elder twin brother Esau, whom he had tricked out of receiving their father Isaac's blessing of the first-born. On his flight, Jacob rested at a city called Luz and used a group of stones as a pillow.

10 And Jacob went out from Beersheba, and went toward Haran.

11 And he lighted upon a certain place, and tarried there all night, because the sun was set; and he took of the stones of that place, and put them for his pillows, and lay down in that place to sleep.

12 And he dreamed, and behold a ladder set up on the earth, and the top of it reached to heaven: and behold the angels of God ascending and descending on it.

13 And, behold, the Lord stood above it, and said, I am the Lord God of Abraham thy father, and the God of Isaac: the land whereon thou liest, to thee will I give it, and to thy seed;

14 And thy seed shall be as the dust of the earth, and thou shalt spread abroad to the west, and to the east, and to the north, and to the south: and in thee and in thy seed shall all the families of the earth be blessed.

15 And, behold, I am with thee, and will keep thee in all places whither thou goest, and will bring thee again into this land; for I will not leave thee, until I have done that which I have spoken to thee of.

After waking up, Jacob exclaimed, "How dreadful is this place! this is none other but the house of God, and this is the gate of heaven." Subsequently, he called the place Bethel, which translates to "House of God". He set up the stone he had slept on as a pillow, and consecrated it. He also made a vow to God in reference to his eventual return.

Other traditions

Some Scottish legends surrounding the Stone of Scone, traditionally used for coronations of Scottish kings in the High Middle Ages, have identified this stone with the Stone of Jacob. Supposedly the Stone of Jacob was brought to Ireland by the prophet Jeremiah and thence to Scotland. The 17th-century writer John Speed, describing the coronation of James I, calls the stone at Westminster Abbey by the Latin name, saxum Jacobi.

These legends also feature prominently in British Israelism a belief system that holds the British royal family is descended from King David. From 1308 to 1996, the Stone of Scone rested  in the Royal throne of England at Westminster. On 23 December 2020 it was announced by the Scottish Government that the stone is to be relocated to a newly renovated 'Hall of Destiny' in Perth's city centre, only a few miles from Scone.

References 

Sacred rocks
Jacob
Hebrew Bible objects
Book of Genesis